The Desaturating Seven is the ninth studio album by American rock group Primus, released on September 29, 2017. It is the band's first album of original material since 2011's Green Naugahyde, and is the first LP featuring original material written  with drummer Tim Alexander since 1995's Tales from the Punchbowl.

Background and composition

The Desaturating Seven is a concept album based on the 1978 children's book The Rainbow Goblins, written by Italian author of children's books, Ul de Rico. Band leader Les Claypool used to read the book to his children when they were younger, and was fascinated and inspired by the book's vibrant artwork and use of colors. Claypool always felt the book's story would make a fascinating musical project, and eventually approached his fellow band members about recording original music based on the story of the book. This is the second Primus album based on a movie or book, the first being the 2014 album, Primus & the Chocolate Factory with the Fungi Ensemble, and is their shortest full-length album to date.

The album has been noted as a stylistic change for Primus, exploring more traditional aspects of progressive rock than their previous releases. The influence of King Crimson, especially the album Discipline (1981), is evident.

Critical reception

The Desaturating Seven garnered generally positive reviews. The album received an average score of 68/100 from 9 reviews on Metacritic, indicating "generally favorable reviews". AllMusic's Neil Z. Yeung said that the album is "typically eccentric, it's an interesting exercise, although nonessential outside the sphere of Primus/Claypool devotees." Nina Corcoran of The A.V. Club had a positive impression, noting the album's digestibility and admirable message. Consequence of Sound's Brice Ezell criticizes the album's length, saying that it "errs a bit too much on the side of brevity, resulting in a record that feels like an EP that has overstayed its welcome." Alan Ranta of Exclaim! said that The Desaturating Seven "demonstrate[s] songcraft beyond the great majority of [Primus'] catalogue." PopMatters' Chris Conaton also lamented the album's shortness, but he praised its music, calling it "the tightest, most focused album of Primus' career."

Track listing
All tracks written by Les Claypool.

Personnel
 Les Claypool – vocals, bass guitar, upright bass
 Larry LaLonde – electric guitar, acoustic guitar
 Tim "Herb" Alexander – drums, percussion
 Justin Chancellor – the goblin master (narration on track 1)

Charts

References

Primus (band) albums
2017 albums